Bugiri is a town in the Eastern Region of Uganda. It is the chief town of Bugiri District, and the district headquarters are located there. The town was elevated to Municipal Council status in 2019.

Location
The coordinates of the town are:0°34'10.0"N, 33°44'55.0"E (Latitude:0.569450; Longitude:33.748600).

Overview
Lying on the main highway between Kampala and the border towns of Malaba and Busia, Bugiri experiences a lot of automotive traffic carrying passengers and goods wholly within Uganda and to Rwanda, Burundi, and parts of the Democratic Republic of the Congo.

The town is also known as a home of  rice growing and processing company Tilda Uganda and its booming sex-trade, particularly in its suburb of Naluwerere.

Population
The 2002 national census estimated the population of the town at 17,050. In 2010, the Uganda Bureau of Statistics (UBOS) estimated the population at 24,800. In 2011, UBOS estimated the mid-year population at 25,900. In 2014, the national population census put the population at 29,013.

In 2020, UBOS estimated the mid-year population of Bugiri at 36,000 people. The agency calculated the estimated population growth rate in the town to average 3.92 percent annually, between 2014 and 2020.

Points of interest
The following points of interest lie within the town limits or near its borders:
A branch of Posta Uganda
The headquarters of Bugiri District Administration
The offices of Bugiri Town Council
Bugiri General Hospital, a 100-bed public hospital administered by the Uganda Ministry of Health
Bugiri central market
Jinja-Malaba Road, passes through the town in a general west to east direction.

See also
 List of cities and towns in Uganda

References

External links
 Gigantic Tree in Bugiri Town

Populated places in Eastern Region, Uganda
Cities in the Great Rift Valley
Bugiri District
Busoga